Kœnig pipe organ builders, as known as manufacture d'orgues Kœnig, is a French firm that designs, builds and restores pipe organs. This organ building family owned manufacture is based in Sarre-Union, Alsace, since 1945.

Achievements 
Kœnig is specifically renowned for being the first contemporary organ builder to have performed in 1967 the recreation of a pipe organ, complying with the precepts found in 1778 book L'Art du facteur d'orgues by Dom Bédos. This masterpiece can be seen in Saint-Georges' Church of Bouquenom in Sarre-Union.

The workshop regularly contributes to the restoration of historical listed organs.

History 
Jean-Georges Koenig, born on May 16, 1920 in Strasbourg and died on November 26, 1992, purchased the business from the widow of organ builder Henry Vondrasek in order to resurrect the factory that had been established in 1930.

Yves Kœnig, born on May 16, 1950, began working with his father in the 1970s and fully took over the business in 1982.

He is assisted since 2008 by Julien Marchal, born on Octobre 29, 1990 who he gradually prepares to his succession.

References
as checked on the corresponding article in the French Wikipedia.

External links 
 Official website

Pipe organ building companies
Musical instrument manufacturing companies of France
French pipe organ builders
Companies based in Grand Est
French brands